The Bahrain national badminton team represents Bahrain in international badminton team competitions. The Bahrain Badminton & Squash Federation organizes any event or national event in the national team. Bahrain have competed in badminton at the Asian Games.

The Bahrain team have also competed in the Pan Arab Games. The team won two bronzes.

Participation in Badminton Asia Team Championships 
Mixed team

Participation in Pan Arab Games 

Men's team

Women's team

Current squad 

Men
Adnan Ebrahim
Elyas Jaffar
Randy Bacia
Jayakumar Pullani
Christopher Basteen
Kiranlal Kandiyil
Muhammad Reksa Warida Saputra

Women
Lizbeth Binu
Sushmita Kolloju
Thanvi Jeyashankar
Rehana Sunder

References 

Badminton
National badminton teams
Badminton in Bahrain